Langvassbukt Chapel is a chapel of the Church of Norway in Kvæfjord Municipality in Troms og Finnmark county, Norway. It is located in the village of Langvassbukta, along the Gullesfjorden on the island of Hinnøya. It is an annex chapel for the Kvæfjord parish which is part of the Trondenes prosti (deanery) in the Diocese of Nord-Hålogaland. The brown, wooden chapel was built in a long church style in 1981.

See also
List of churches in Nord-Hålogaland

References

Kvæfjord
Churches in Troms
Wooden churches in Norway
20th-century Church of Norway church buildings
Churches completed in 1981
1981 establishments in Norway
Long churches in Norway